Wolf Waldemar Karni (4 February 1911 – 31 January 1996) was a Finnish football referee.

Karni was born as Ze'ev Wulf Koseloff and changed his name in 1935. He used to play football and handball in the Jewish clubs Kadur Vyborg and Makkabi Helsinki.

Wolf Karni was an international football referee from 1949 to 1955. He officiated four matches at the 1952 Summer Olympics in Helsinki, including the semi-final match between Yugoslavia and Germany.

International matches

See also
List of Jews in sports (non-players)

References 

1911 births
1996 deaths
Sportspeople from Vyborg
People from Viipuri Province (Grand Duchy of Finland)
Jewish footballers
Finnish Jews
Finnish football referees
Olympic football referees
Finnish footballers
Association footballers not categorized by position